Akaoudj is a village in Kabylie, in north-eastern Algeria, belonging to the municipality of Aissa Mimoun (wilaya of Tizi-Ouzou). Akaoudj is located just opposite the village of Ardjaouna (village overlooking the town of Tizi Ouzou) at an altitude of about 500 meters.

Gallery

References
 https://web.archive.org/web/20110715082251/http://www.photosdalgerie.com/data/media/20/Akaoudj__Ait_Aissa_Mimoun.jpg

External links
 https://web.archive.org/web/20090808175259/http://www.photoalgerie.com/categorie-3-photo-74.html

Populated places in Tizi Ouzou Province